The women's 4 × 100 metre freestyle relay event at the 2008 Olympic Games took place on 9–10 August at the Beijing National Aquatics Center in Beijing, China.

The Dutch women reinforced their claim to become the strongest team in the world with a magnificent triumph over the Aussies and the Americans in the event. Pulling nearly a worst-to-first effort from a seventh-place turn by Inge Dekker (54.37), Ranomi Kromowidjojo (53.39) and Femke Heemskerk (53.42) moved the team further into the top spot, until they handed Marleen Veldhuis the anchor duties on the final exchange to cruise the field down the stretch in 52.58 and to snatch the freestyle relay title with an Olympic record of 3:33.76.

Competing in her fifth Olympics since 1984, U.S. legend Dara Torres anchored her team with a remarkable split of 52.44, the second-fastest of all time, to deliver the foursome of Natalie Coughlin (54.00), Lacey Nymeyer (53.91), and Kara Lynn Joyce (53.98) a silver medal in a new American record of 3:34.33. Meanwhile, Australia's Cate Campbell (54.43), Alice Mills (54.43), Melanie Schlanger (53.85), and Lisbeth Trickett (52.34) powered home with a bronze in an Oceanian record of 3:35.05, holding off the fast-pacing Chinese squad of Zhu Yingwen (54.12), Tang Yi (54.19), Xu Yanwei (54.64), and Pang Jiaying (52.69) by 59-hundredths of a second, a superb Asian standard of 3:35.64.

Britta Steffen shaved off Inge de Bruijn's 2000 Olympic record by 0.39 seconds with a blazing split of 53.38 to take an early lead for the Germans, but the other threesome of Meike Freitag (54.30), Daniela Götz (55.34), and Antje Buschschulte (53.83) could not maintain their pace and thereby occupied the fifth spot in 3:36.85. France (3:37.68), Great Britain (3:38.18), and Canada (3:38.32) picked up the remaining places to complete a close finish.

Records
Prior to this competition, the existing world and Olympic records were as follows.

The following new world and Olympic records were set during this competition.

Results

Heats

Final

References

External links
Official Olympic Report

Women's freestyle relay 4 x 100 metre
4 × 100 metre freestyle relay
Olympics
2008 in women's swimming
Women's events at the 2008 Summer Olympics